Deven Gibxawi (born 3 September 2000) is an Eritrean footballer who plays for Eritrean Premier League club Red Sea FC and the Eritrea national team.

International career
Gibxawi made his senior international debut on 9 December 2019 in a 2019 CECAFA Cup match against Burundi.

International career statistics

References

External links
 

Living people
2000 births
Eritrean footballers
Eritrea international footballers
Association football forwards
Red Sea FC players
Eritrean Premier League players
People from Asmara
21st-century Eritrean people